Fortagonum is a genus of beetles in the family Carabidae, containing the following species:

 Fortagonum acuticolle Baehr, 1995 
 Fortagonum bisetosiceps Baehr, 1995
 Fortagonum bufo Darlington, 1952
 Fortagonum curtum Baehr, 1992
 Fortagonum cychriceps Darlington, 1952
 Fortagonum denticulatum Baehr, 1995
 Fortagonum depressum Baehr, 1995
 Fortagonum forceps Darlington, 1952
 Fortagonum formiceps Darlington, 1971
 Fortagonum globulipenne Baehr, 1998
 Fortagonum insulare Baehr, 2001
 Fortagonum laevigatum Baehr, 1998
 Fortagonum latum Baehr, 1995
 Fortagonum sinak Baehr, 1998
 Fortagonum skalei Baehr, 2007
 Fortagonum spinipenne Baehr, 1998
 Fortagonum spinosum Baehr, 1995
 Fortagonum subconicolle (Darlington, 1971)
 Fortagonum unipunctatum Baehr, 1995

References

External links
 iNaturalist

Platyninae